Circle is an unincorporated community in Cherokee County, located in the U.S. state of Texas. According to the Handbook of Texas, there were no population estimates available for the community in 2000. It is located within the Tyler-Jacksonville combined statistical area.

History
The area in what is known as Circle today may have been settled sometime after the American Civil War. A post office was established at Circle in 1898 and remained in operation until 1905. It had several stores, a church, and several scattered houses in the mid-1930s. Many residents left the community after World War II, but in the early 1990s, Circle had a church, a store, and several scattered houses. It did not have any population recorded in 2000, but it was listed on county maps.

Geography

Education
Circle had its own school in the early 1990s. Today, the community is served by the Rusk Independent School District.

Notes

Unincorporated communities in Cherokee County, Texas
Unincorporated communities in Texas